Windham Junior/Senior High School is a public high school in Windham, Ohio, Portage County, Ohio It is the only high school in the Windham Exempted Village School District. Their mascot is the Bombers and compete as a member of the Ohio High School Athletic Association and is a member of the Northeastern Athletic Conference. Windham High School was founded in 1883.

Athletics
Windham High School currently offers:

 Baseball
 Basketball
 Cheerleading
 Football
 Golf
 Softball
 Track and field
 Volleyball

History
The Bombers have at least one league championship in every sport in which they participate.  During the late 1950s, the school played a leading role in establishing the short-lived Tomahawk Conference and was a longtime member of the former Portage County League and Portage Trail Conference.

In 1939, the school was ranked by The American Boy magazine as the 16th best in the nation for six-man football. This selection was made by Stephen Epler, the creator of what was then a fairly new sport.  The Bombers defeated Stamford Collegiate Secondary School in Niagara Falls, Ontario for the first-ever international title on October 5, 1940, and were ranked in the top 10 in the nation by The American Boy magazine. Three members of the team, Harold and Fred Stanley and Robert Turner, were chosen as All-American players, the only Windham players ever so honored.

Tomahawk Conference

According to the Ravenna-Kent Record-Courier, Windham competed in the Portage County League until 1953, when the Windham school district became the Windham Exempted Village School District.  In Ohio, Exempted Village School Districts are given similar authority to city school districts; i.e. to "determine for itself the number of members and the organization of the district board of education".  At this time, Windham withdrew from the PCL and competed as an independent.

Prior to 1953, most schools in Portage County were given "A" classification in Ohio's system of measuring school size for athletics.  Due to increasing enrollment from the construction of the Ravenna Arsenal a decade earlier, Windham was close to "AA" classification.  In 1957, Windham had an exceptional year in football, posting an undefeated record of six wins and a tie.  In order to maintain "A" classification, Windham cut freshmen from the team at the beginning of the season.  However, in contests against Garrettsville and Ravenna Township, football coach Leo Kot played two freshmen to prevent running up the score.  These contests led directly to Windham's classification as "AA" upon appeal from Mogadore High School, and the subsequent formation of the Tomahawk Conference.

The Bombers won the Tomahawk Conference championship for football all three years of the conference's existence, sharing the title with Southeast in 1959.  Windham also won all three conference titles in baseball, and in 1961 the Bombers were state runners-up, losing the state baseball championship to Liberty Union High School.

Later athletics leagues
In 1961, the Bombers returned to the reconstituted Portage County League. Windham continued to enjoy success in football, and numerous other sports.

The PCL became the basis of the extant Portage Trail Conference, created through inter-county expansion in 2005.  On July 2, 2011, Windham announced that it would be leaving the PTC following the 2012–13 school year and joining the Northeastern Athletic Conference, citing declining enrollment and a resulting decreasing ability to compete in the PTC. In its first three years of competition, Windham won several league championships in volleyball and girls basketball.

Stan Parrish 
Windham served as the first head coaching job for later college and professional football coach Stan Parrish. Parrish coached the Bombers from 1972 until 1974 after serving as an assistant from 1969–71.

Notable alumni
Thomson Jay Hudson - world-renowned researcher in parapsychology
Laurin D. Woodworth - Civil War major and member of the United States House of Representatives
Angela Johnson - Children's book author

Notes and references

External links
 

High schools in Portage County, Ohio
Educational institutions established in 1883
Public high schools in Ohio
1883 establishments in Ohio